The Word DMA (WDMA) interface was the fastest method used to transfer data between the computer (through the Advanced Technology Attachment  (ATA) controller) and an ATA device until Ultra Direct Memory Access (UDMA) was implemented. Single/Multiword DMA took over from Programmed input/output (PIO) as the choice of interface between ATA devices and the computer.
The WDMA interface is grouped into different modes.

In single transfer mode, only one word (16-bit) will be transferred between the device and the computer before returning control to the CPU, and later it will repeat this cycle, allowing the CPU to process data while data is transferred. In multiword transfer mode (block mode), once a transfer has begun it will continue until all words are transferred.

Two additional Advanced Timing modes have been defined in the CompactFlash specification 2.1. Those are Multiword DMA mode 3 and Multiword DMA mode 4. They are specific to CompactFlash. Multiword DMA is only permitted for CompactFlash devices configured in True IDE mode.

AT Attachment the category